Expressway S3 or express road S3 (in Polish droga ekspresowa S3) is a major road under development in Poland, which is planned to run from Świnoujście on the Baltic Sea through Szczecin, Gorzów Wielkopolski, Zielona Góra and Legnica, to the border with the Czech Republic, where it will connect to the planned D11 motorway.

The main section from Szczecin (A6) through Jordanowo (A2) to Legnica (A4) was constructed mainly in years 2008 – 2021, and is completed on the whole intended length.

The sections from Legnica (A4) to the Czech border and from Świnoujście to Szczecin (A6) are partially finished and partially under construction, with contracted completions in 2023 and 2024, respectively.

Motorway A3 was planned to be built along this route before, but the decision was made to build a lower standard "express road" as the traffic density was judged too low to justify a motorway. Nonetheless, S3 shares the crucial properties of an autostrada, including physical separation, restricted access, all interchanges being grade-separated, and (upon completion) at least two continuous lanes in each direction as well as emergency lanes (hard shoulder).

Route

History

Initial route plans (autostrada A3)
The autostrada A3 was a motorway planned from 1993 to 2001 that was supposed to be built in western Poland. It was planned to begin in Szczecin, link Zielona Góra, Bolków and end in Lubawka on the Polish-Czech border.

Some road maps published in 1990s had an approximate route of the motorway, which in some places were different from the final route of S3, most notably the motorway was supposed to form north-eastern bypass of Legnica while S3 was constructed as its western bypass.

One legacy of the road having been planned as an autostrada is that from the beginning it was being constructed on a completely new alignment (some distance away from the old route of the DK3 road). This is akin to how most expressways in Poland are constructed nowadays, but in contrast to the standards of the 2000s when most of the expressways were constructed by upgrading existing roads.

Świnoujście – Szczecin
One section of S3 east of Szczecin (19 km) was constructed in the 1970s in an expressway standard of those times, featuring some one-level intersections and a pedestrian crossing. It was reconstructed in 2019–2020 to meet contemporary standards with the intersections and the pedestrian crossing upgraded to grade-separated ones.

S3 south of Szczecin overlaps with A6 motorway (see Autostrada A6: History of construction).

Szczecin – Legnica
A single carriageway was constructed in years 1985–1995 on the section Sulechów–Zielona Góra (27 km). Three short sections were constructed in years 2001–2008, also with the first carriageway only.

The first large section of S3 was the stretch from Szczecin to Gorzów Wielkopolski (82 km), opened to traffic in 2010, followed by the stretch from Gorzów Wielkopolski to Sulechów (80.6 km), opened to traffic in 2013/2014. The new sections had two carriageways, separated by the older stretches (Sulechów–Nowa Sól, Gorzów Wielkopolski bypass and Międzyrzecz bypass) which still remained as single-carriageway.

In 2014–2017/2018, the expressway between Nowa Sól and Legnica (junction with A4) was constructed, and the second carriageway was added on the three older stretches. The exception was the section Polkowice - Lubin, which was also contracted to be completed in the first half of 2018, but the deal with Salini Impregilo was terminated in 2019 due to extensive delays in construction. It was ultimately opened to traffic in 2021.

Legnica – border with Czech Republic
Signing the contracts for construction of all four stretches between A4 at Legnica and the Czech border was planned for 2014, however in 2013 it was announced that the section will not enter construction before 2017. As the reason, the officials cited delays in preparations in the Czech Republic, which meant that the connecting motorway on the Czech side of the border might enter into construction in 2018 at the earliest (currently, it is expected that the section will enter into construction in 2024/2025 rather than 2018). Some of the money allocated for it has been re-purposed to build the S2 expressway in Warsaw.

Later the decision was partially reversed, and in 2014 two tenders were opened for the section between Legnica and Bolków. This part (35.8 km) was constructed in years 2015–2018.

Two remaining contracts for the section from Bolków to the Czech border were signed in October 2018, with the completion dates of November 2021 and June 2023.

Exit List

References

See also
Highways in Poland
European route E65

Expressways in Poland
Proposed roads in Poland